Sorana Cîrstea was the defending champion but chose not to participate.

Daria Snigur won the title, defeating Kristína Kučová in the final, 6–3, 6–0.

Seeds

Draw

Finals

Top half

Bottom half

References

Main Draw

Al Habtoor Tennis Challenge - Singles
2021 Singles